is a 2011 Japanese television series. It is a remake of the 2007 drama series of the same Japanese title which is also based on the manga Hana-Kimi, but it features an entirely new cast.

Cast

Second dormitory students
 Atsuko Maeda as Mizuki Ashiya
 Aoi Nakamura as Izumi Sano
 Shohei Miura as Shuichi Nakatsu
 Renn Kiriyama as Minami Nanba
 Tomo Yanagishita as Taiki Kayashima 
 Shintaro Yamada as Kyogo Sekime
 Yukito Nishii as Nakao Senri 
 Katsuhiro Suzuki as Shinji Noe
 Yuki Kashiwagi as Juri Kishinosato
 Shota Matsushima as Masafumi Katsura
 Shotaro Mamiya as Keisuke Awaji
 Goro Kurihara as Kota Hanaten
 Yuki Sato as Makoto Kagurazaka

First dormitory students
 Shinnosuke Mitsushima as Megumi Tennoji
 Goki Maeda as Kohei Kitahanada
 Arata Horii as Kumatori Jin 
 Ryosuke Yamamoto as Kiyoshikojin Akira 
 Ryu Ando as Mukonoso Andrew 
 Koudai Asaka as Subaru Takatsuki
 Sonde Kanai as Kazuki Obitoke
 Shotaro Kotani as Hiroto Moriguchi
 Tomoki Okayama as Kadoma Shotaro

Third dormitory students
 Hidenori Tokuyama as Oscar M. Himejima / Himejima Masao
 Miyajima Kusuto as Yaenosato Nobuhiro
 Takami Ozora as Kyobate Sansui 
 Taiko Katono as Kawachimori Hisashi 
 Kasai Shige as Mozu Yasushi
 Kawahara Kazuma as Narayama Sakon
 Okazaki Kazuhiro as Izumigaoka Hideharu
 Kettaro as Minamikata Shin

Others
 Saito Takumi as Umeda Hokuto
 Ikkei Watanabe as the chef
 Mirai Yamamoto as Io Nanba

Tokyo Gakuen students
 Sato Yuki as Kagurazaka Makoto
 Endo Kaname as Otemachi Ryo
 Nagakura Masaaki as Takebashi Yutaka
 Okubo Naoki as Tsukishima Jun
 Kaminaga Keisuke as Kasai Go
 Tozuka Junki as Kudanshita Takeshi
 Okayama Amane as Ochiai Nobuyuki

St. Blossom's Academy students
 Mayuko Iwasa as Hanayashiki Hibari
 Yuki Kashiwagi as Kishinosato Juri
 Miori Ichikawa as Amagasaki Kanna
 Mina Oba as Abeno Erika
 Mariya Nagao as Kanbe Yumemi
 Matsumoto Misaki
 Wakaki Moe
 Terayama Aoi
 Hotta Risa
 Kurisaki Hiroko
 Kuno Kanako
 Takahashi Miho
 Yanagawa Miho
 Tsuchiya Haruhi
 Shimomiya Rihoko
 Kasai Yukina

Guest roles
 Mana Ashida as Sasakura Kaoru (ep1, cameo)
 Fuku Suzuki as Sasakura Tomoki (ep1, cameo) 
 Sayuri Iwata as Yamashina Rika (ep2)
  as  aka Oscar (ep6, cameo)

Episode list

Theme Song
The theme song for this series is AKB48's 22nd single title track Flying Get.

International broadcast
 Asia - WakuWaku Japan

References

External links
  

Japanese drama television series
2011 Japanese television series debuts
2011 Japanese television series endings
Yasushi Akimoto
Fuji TV dramas

ja:花ざかりの君たちへ (テレビドラマ)#花ざかりの君たちへ〜イケメン☆パラダイス〜2011